Hastings was a brig that the Bombay Dockyard launched in 1785 or 1787 for the Bengal Pilot Service. In 1818, the EIC sold her to local buyers. Alternatively, in May 1818 she was converted to a buoy vessel; in 1819 she appeared as a buoy vessel on a list of pilot vessels at Calcutta with J.F. Twisden, master. She was sold on 11 October 1820. A fire destroyed her on the night of 17 April 1823, while she was at Pulau Pasang, off Padang.

Citations

References
 
 
 

1780s ships
Ships of the British East India Company
Maritime incidents in April 1823